Reg Poole is an Australian country singer-songwriter. Poole won three Golden Guitars, was inducted into the Roll of Renown in 2006, was awarded an OAM for services to country music in 2006 and in 2016 was elevated to Country Music living legend; as award designed to honour the achievements of those who have made a lasting contribution to country music in Australia and are actively engaged in writing, recording and performing.

Career
Poole left his dairy farm in the 1970s to pursue a career in music and won his first Golden Guitar in 1974.

In 1977 Poole signed with Selection Records releasing several highly successful recordings over the next three decades, and became well known for concept albums, particularly with rodeo and truck themes.

Discography

Albums
This list of songs or music-related items is incomplete; you can help by expanding it.

Awards

Australian Roll of Renown
The Australian Roll of Renown honours Australian and New Zealander musicians who have shaped the music industry by making a significant and lasting contribution to Country Music. It was inaugurated in 1976 and the inductee is announced at the Country Music Awards of Australia in Tamworth in January.

|-
| 2006
| Reg Poole
| Australian Roll of Renown
|

Country Music Awards of Australia
The Country Music Awards of Australia (CMAA) (also known as the Golden Guitar Awards) is an annual awards night held in January during the Tamworth Country Music Festival, celebrating recording excellence in the Australian country music industry. They have been held annually since 1973.

|-
| 1974
| Reg Poole
| New Talent of the Year
| 
|-
| 1981
| "The Warrumbungle Mare "
| Heritage Award
| 
|-
| 1985
| "When the Big Mobs Came to Bourke"
| Heritage Award
| 
|-

Tamworth Songwriters Awards
The Tamworth Songwriters Association (TSA) is an annual songwriting contest for original country songs, awarded in January at the Tamworth Country Music Festival. They commenced in 1986.
 (wins only)
|-
| 2014
| Reg Poole
| Songmaker Award
| 
|-

References

Living people
Australian male singers
Australian musicians
Australian singer-songwriters
1944 births